The National Scenic Areas in Taiwan (Chinese: , Taiwanese: Kok-ka Hong-kéng-khu, Hakka: Koet-kâ Fûng-kín-khî) are managed by the Tourism Bureau, Ministry of Transportation and Communications. Currently, there are thirteen national scenic areas.

See also 
 List of tourist attractions in Taiwan
 National parks of Taiwan

External links
 Taiwan Tourism Bureau's National Scenic Areas web pages

Geography of Taiwan
Environment of Taiwan
Taiwan geography-related lists